Cubjac-Auvézère-Val d'Ans (Limousin: Cujac Auvesera Vau d'Ans o Cujac-Auvesera-Vau d'Ans) is a commune in the department of Dordogne, southwestern France. The municipality was established on 1 January 2017 by merger of the former communes of Cubjac (the seat), La Boissière-d'Ans and Saint-Pantaly-d'Ans.

See also 
Communes of the Dordogne department

References 

Communes of Dordogne